Tony J.M.M. Van Parys (born 21 June 1951) is a Belgian CD&V politician.

Van Parys was first chosen to the Belgian Chamber of Representatives in 1985, on a CVP ticket. He was chiefly Minister of Justice in the second Dehaene government (1998-1999).

Van Parys was part of the 1988 parliamentary commission looking into the "ways that banditry and terrorism suppression are organized [in Belgium]." Together with Philippe Laurent of the Parti social chrétien he wrote the main report that detailed the results.

He was elected as a member of the Belgian Senate in 2007. Van Parys succeeded Erik De Lembre as chairman of the board of directors of Ghent's Arteveldehogeschool in October 2011.

Notes

1951 births
Living people
Christian Democratic and Flemish politicians
Members of the Belgian Federal Parliament
Politicians from Ghent